The  Hamidiye Marşı was the imperial anthem of the Ottoman Empire from 1876 to 1909. In 1876, Sultan Abdul Hamid II had the Hamidiye March composed for him by Necip Paşa. This was also the first Ottoman Sultan's march that contained lyrics.

Lyrics

References 

Anthems
Abdul Hamid II